"Nanairo no Ashita: Brand New Beat / Your Color" is BoA's nineteenth Japanese single and her fifth double A-side single. It is her first single to be released in both CD and in CD+DVD formats. The former is an upbeat pop song while the latter is a ballad, similar to her previous single, Everlasting. This is her first single released off of her fifth Japanese studio album, Made in Twenty (20).

Overview
Although Nanairo no Ashita: Brand New Beat / Your Color didn't reach the top spot on the charts, its first week sales were the highest BoA had achieved since Do the Motion. Moreover, the long chart life which the single was able to achieve allowed it to become her 8th highest selling single to date. The single debuted at number one on its first day, however it wasn't able to secure the number one spot on the weekly charts. Instead, it debuted third on the chart. On iTunes however, the single reached the number one spot. Nanairo no Ashita reached to the number one spot on its own, while Your Color reached the number fourth spot.

Music video
BoA's Brand New Beat music video featured many scenes where she and three other female dancers were dancing and playing games with the other four male dancers. Two music videos were filmed for Brand New Beat, one was the standard version and the other was the Dance version which is similar to the standard version but with more dance segments.

Commercial endorsements
Nanairo no Ashita ~Brand New Beat~ was used as the theme song in a KOSE Fasio commercial. Your Color was used as the ending theme song for Xbox 360 game Ninety-Nine Nights.
Nanairo no Ashita is also included in the special album Sweet Memories with Girls' Generation.

Track listing

CD
 Nanairo no Ashita: Brand New Beat
 Your Color
 Nanairo no Ashita: Brand New Beat (TV Mix)
 Your Color (TV Mix)

DVD
 Nanairo no Ashita: Brand New Beat (PV)
 Nanairo no Ashita: Brand New Beat (Dance Version)

TV performances
March 31, 2006 — Music Station Spring Super Live - "Nanairo no Ashita ~Brand New Beat~"
April 3, 2006 — Hey! Hey! Hey! 500th Episode Special Live - "Nanairo no Ashita ~Brand New Beat~"
April 7, 2006 — Music Fighter - "Your Color"
April 15, 2006 — CDTV - "Your Color"
December 22, 2006 - Music Station Super Live 2006 - "Nanairo no Ashita ~Brand New Beat~"

Charts
'Oricon Sales Chart

References
https://web.archive.org/web/20090304013241/http://www.avexnet.or.jp/boa/index.html

2006 singles
BoA songs